The year 1990 in film involved many significant events as shown below. Universal Pictures celebrated its 75th anniversary in 1990.

Highest-grossing films

The top 10 films released in 1990 by worldwide gross are as follows:

Events
 March 2 - The Hunt for Red October is released. It is the first film in Tom Clancy's "Jack Ryan" franchise and is met with critical and blockbuster commercial success.
 March 23 – Pretty Woman is released and grosses $463 million, making Julia Roberts a worldwide star.
 March 30 – Teenage Mutant Ninja Turtles is released to massive box office success. At the time, it is the highest-grossing independent film in history.
 May 25 – Universal Pictures unveils a new opening logo with music composed by James Horner,  which debuts on Back to the Future Part III. It is the first change to the Universal opening logo in 27 years.
 June 1  – CGI technique is expanded with motion capture for CGI characters, used in Total Recall.
 June 15 – Following a massive media and marketing blitz, Dick Tracy is released. Walt Disney Studios chairman Jeffrey Katzenberg expressed disappointment in a studio memo that noted that the film had cost about $100 million in total to produce, market and promote and with its disappointing performance claimed "We made demands on our time, talent and treasury that, upon reflection, may not have been worth it".
 June 22 – The use of real-time computer graphics or "digital puppetry" to create a character in a motion picture is performed, in RoboCop 2.
 July 4 – The first digitally-manipulated matte painting is used, in Die Hard 2.
 July 13 - Ghost, starring Patrick Swayze, Demi Moore and Whoopi Goldberg, is released and grosses $506 million, making it the third highest-grossing movie at the time.
 November 9 – Kevin Costner's directorial debut, Dances with Wolves, is released. It later earns twelve Academy Award nominations and wins seven, including Best Picture and Best Director for Costner.
 November 16
 Home Alone is released. It spends twelve consecutive weeks at number one on the United States box office, becoming both the highest-grossing film of the year and the highest-grossing comedy of all-time.
The Rescuers Down Under is considered as the first fully digital film ever made.
 December 24 – Tom Cruise and Nicole Kidman marry.
 Buchwald v. Paramount decided, a leading case on the financial rewards due to writers of film treatments.

Awards

1990 wide-release movies

January–March

April–June

July–September

October–December

Notable films released in 1990
United States except where noted.

A
 The Adventures of Ford Fairlane, directed Renny Harlin,  by starring Andrew Dice Clay
 After Dark, My Sweet, directed by James Foley, starring Jason Patric, Rachel Ward and Bruce Dern
 Air America, directed by Roger Spottiswoode, starring Mel Gibson and Robert Downey Jr.
 Alice, directed by Woody Allen, starring Mia Farrow, Joe Mantegna and William Hurt
 The Ambulance, directed by Larry Cohen, starring Eric Roberts, Megan Gallagher, James Earl Jones, Janine Turner and Red Buttons
 American Ninja 4: The Annihilation, directed by Cedric Sundstrom, starring Michael Dudikoff, David Bradley and James Booth
 Angel Town, directed by Olivier Gruner, starring Olivier Gruner and Theresa Saldana
 Another 48 Hrs., directed by Walter Hill, starring Eddie Murphy and Nick Nolte
 Arachnophobia, directed by Frank Marshall, starring Jeff Daniels, John Goodman, Harley Jane Kozak and Julian Sands
 Avalon, directed by Barry Levinson, starring Aidan Quinn, Elizabeth Perkins and Kevin Pollak
 Awakenings, directed by Penny Marshall, starring Robin Williams and Robert De Niro

B
 Back to the Future Part III, directed by Robert Zemeckis, starring Michael J. Fox, Christopher Lloyd and Mary Steenburgen
 Bad Influence, directed by Curtis Hanson, starring James Spader and Rob Lowe
 Bad Jim, directed by Clyde Ware, starring James Brolin, Richard Roundtree, and John Clark Gable
 Betsy's Wedding, directed by and starring Alan Alda, with Molly Ringwald, Ally Sheedy and Madeline Kahn
 The Big Man aka Crossing the Line, directed by David Leland, starring Liam Neeson, Joanne Whalley and Billy Connolly
 The Big Steal, directed by Nadia Tass, starring Ben Mendelsohn, Claudia Karvan and Steve Bisley
 Bird on a Wire, directed by John Badham, starring Mel Gibson and Goldie Hawn
 Blind Fury, directed by Phillip Noyce, starring Rutger Hauer
 Blue Steel, directed by Kathryn Bigelow, starring Jamie Lee Curtis, Ron Silver, and Clancy Brown
 Boiling Point, directed by Takeshi Kitano, starring Takeshi Ono, Masahiko Ono, Yuriko Ishida and Hisashi Igawa
 The Bonfire of the Vanities, directed by Brian De Palma, starring Tom Hanks, Bruce Willis and Melanie Griffith
 Bride of Re-Animator, directed by Brian Yuzna, starring Jeffrey Combs, Bruce Abbott, Claude Earl Jones and Fabiana Udenio

C
 Cadence, directed by Martin Sheen, starring Charlie Sheen and Martin Sheen
 Cadillac Man, directed by Roger Donaldson, starring Robin Williams and Tim Robbins
 Captain America, directed by Albert Pyun, starring Matt Salinger
 Childhood Days, directed by Masahiro Shinoda, starring Tetsuya Fujita and Yuji Horioka 
 Child's Play 2, directed by John Lafia, starring Jenny Agutter, Alex Vincent, Gerrit Graham, Christine Elise and Grace Zabriskie
 China Cry. directed by James F. Collier, starring Julia Nickson-Soul, France Nuyen and James Shigeta
 City Hunter: Bay City Wars
 Class of 1999, directed by Mark L. Lester, starring Bradley Gregg, Traci Lind, Malcolm McDowell and Pam Grier
 Close-Up, directed by Abbas Kiarostami, starring Hossain Sabzian and Mohsen Makhmalbaf
 Come See the Paradise, directed by Alan Parker, starring Dennis Quaid and Tamlyn Tomita
 The Comfort of Strangers, directed by Paul Schrader, Natasha Richardson, Christopher Walken, Rupert Everett and Helen Mirren
 Crash and Burn. directed by Charles Band, starring Paul Ganus, Megan Ward, Jack McGee and Eva LaRue
 Cry-Baby, directed by John Waters, starring Johnny Depp, Amy Locane, Polly Bergen, Ricki Lake, Traci Lords, Kim McGuire, Darren E. Burrows, Susan Tyrrell and Iggy Pop
 Cyrano de Bergerac, directed by Jean-Paul Rappeneau, starring Gérard Depardieu, Anne Brochet and Vincent Pérez

D
 Dances with Wolves, directed by and starring Kevin Costner – Academy and Golden Globe (drama) Awards for Best Picture
 Darkman, directed by Sam Raimi, starring Liam Neeson, Frances McDormand, Colin Friels and Larry Drake
 Days of Being Wild, directed by Wong Kar-wai, starring Leslie Cheung, Maggie Cheung and Andy Lau
 Days of Thunder, starring Tom Cruise, Robert Duvall, Nicole Kidman
 Death Warrant, starring Jean-Claude Van Damme
 Dei tau lung (Dragon Fighter)
 Delta Force 2: The Colombian Connection, starring Chuck Norris
 Denial
 Desperate Hours, directed by Michael Cimino, starring Anthony Hopkins and Mickey Rourke
 Dick Tracy, directed by and starring Warren Beatty, with Madonna, Glenne Headly, Al Pacino
 Die Hard 2, starring Bruce Willis
 Downtown, starring Anthony Edwards and Forest Whitaker
 Dreams, directed by Akira Kurosawa
 DuckTales the Movie: Treasure of the Lost Lamp

E
 Edward Scissorhands, directed by Tim Burton, starring Johnny Depp, Winona Ryder, Dianne Wiest
 El Diablo, starring Anthony Edwards, Louis Gossett Jr., Robert Beltran, Jim Beaver, Don Collier
 The End of Innocence, directed by and starring Dyan Cannon
 Ernest Goes to Jail, starring Jim Varney
 Europa Europa – Golden Globe Award for Best Foreign Language Film (for 1991)
 The Exorcist III, starring George C. Scott

F
 Fantasia (restored version)
 La Femme Nikita, directed by Luc Besson
 The Field, starring Richard Harris
 Fire Birds, starring Nicolas Cage and Tommy Lee Jones
 The First Power, starring Lou Diamond Phillips
 Flashback, starring Kiefer Sutherland and Dennis Hopper
 Flatliners, directed by Joel Schumacher, starring Kiefer Sutherland, Julia Roberts, Kevin Bacon
 The Fourth War, starring Roy Schneider and Jürgen Prochnow
 Frankenstein Unbound, starring John Hurt
 The Freshman, starring Marlon Brando and Matthew Broderick
 Funny About Love, directed by Leonard Nimoy, starring Gene Wilder and Christine Lahti

G
 Ghost, starring Patrick Swayze, Demi Moore, Whoopi Goldberg
 The Godfather Part III, directed by Francis Ford Coppola, starring Al Pacino, Diane Keaton, Talia Shire, Andy García, Joe Mantegna, Sofia Coppola
 Goodfellas, directed by Martin Scorsese, starring Robert De Niro, Ray Liotta, Joe Pesci, Lorraine Bracco, Paul Sorvino
 Graffiti Bridge, directed by and starring Prince
 Green Card, starring Gérard Depardieu and Andie MacDowell – Golden Globe Award for Best Picture (Musical or Comedy)
 Gremlins 2: The New Batch
 The Grifters, starring Anjelica Huston, John Cusack, Annette Bening
 The Guardian, directed by William Friedkin
 Gunsmoke: The Last Apache, directed by Charles Correll, starring James Arness, Richard Kiley, Michael Learned, Amy Stock-Poynton, Geoffrey Lewis, Hugh O'Brian, Joe Lara
 The Guyver

H
 Hamlet, directed by Franco Zeffirelli, starring Mel Gibson, Glenn Close, Helena Bonham Carter
 The Handmaid's Tale, directed by Volker Schlöndorff, starring Natasha Richardson, Faye Dunaway, Robert Duvall
 Happily Ever After, featuring the voices of Irene Cara, Edward Asner, Carol Channing, Dom DeLuise
 Hard to Kill, starring Steven Seagal
 Havana, directed by Sydney Pollack, starring Robert Redford, Lena Olin, Raúl Juliá
 Heart Condition, starring Bob Hoskins, and Denzel Washington
 Heaven and Earth
 Henry & June, starring Fred Ward, Uma Thurman, Maria de Medeiros and Richard E. Grant
 Henry: Portrait of a Serial Killer
 Hidden Agenda, directed by Ken Loach, starring Frances McDormand
 Home Alone, starring Macaulay Culkin, Joe Pesci, Daniel Stern
 The Hot Spot, directed by Dennis Hopper, starring Don Johnson, Jennifer Connelly, Virginia Madsen
 House Party
 The Hunt for Red October, starring Sean Connery and Alec Baldwin, directed by John McTiernan

I
 I Come in Peace, starring Dolph Lundgren
 I Love You to Death, starring Kevin Kline and Tracey Ullman
 Internal Affairs, directed by Mike Figgis, starring Richard Gere and Andy García

J
 Jacob's Ladder, starring Tim Robbins, directed by Adrian Lyne
 Jetsons: The Movie
 Joe Versus the Volcano, starring Tom Hanks and Meg Ryan
 Journey of Hope (Reise der Hoffnung) – Academy Award for Best Foreign Language Film
 Ju Dou, directed by Zhang Yimou and Yang Fengliang, starring Gong Li

K
 Kindergarten Cop, starring Arnold Schwarzenegger
 King of New York, directed by Abel Ferrara, starring Christopher Walken, Wesley Snipes, Laurence Fishburne
 The Krays, directed by Peter Medak, starring Martin Kemp, Gary Kemp, Billie Whitelaw

L
 Larks on a String (Skrivánci na niti) – Golden Bear award
 Last of the Finest
 Leatherface: The Texas Chainsaw Massacre III
 The Lemon Sisters, starring Diane Keaton
 Life Is Sweet, directed by Mike Leigh, starring Jim Broadbent
 Lionheart, starring Jean-Claude Van Damme
 Longtime Companion, starring Bruce Davison
 The Long Walk Home, starring Sissy Spacek and Whoopi Goldberg
 Look Who's Talking Too, starring John Travolta and Kirstie Alley
 Loose Cannons, starring Gene Hackman and Dan Aykroyd
 Lord of the Flies, starring Balthazar Getty
 Love at Large, starring Tom Berenger

M
 Mack the Knife, starring Raúl Juliá and Richard Harris
 A Man Called Sarge, starring Gary Kroeger and Marc Singer
 Marked for Death, starring Steven Seagal
 The Match Factory Girl, directed by Aki Kaurismäki, starring Kati Outinen
 Memories of a River
 Memphis Belle, directed by Michael Caton-Jones, starring Matthew Modine, Eric Stoltz, John Lithgow
 Men at Work, starring Emilio Estevez and Charlie Sheen
 Mermaids, directed by Richard Benjamin, starring Cher, Bob Hoskins, Winona Ryder, Christina Ricci
 Metropolitan
 Miami Blues, starring Fred Ward and Alec Baldwin
 Midnight Ride, starring Mark Hamill
 Miller's Crossing, directed by Joel and Ethan Coen, starring Gabriel Byrne, Albert Finney, Marcia Gay Harden
 Milou in May
 Misery, directed by Rob Reiner, starring James Caan and Kathy Bates
 Mo' Better Blues, directed by Spike Lee, starring Denzel Washington, Wesley Snipes, Samuel L. Jackson
 Mountains of the Moon, directed by Bob Rafelson, starring Patrick Bergin
 Movie... In Your Face
 Mr. and Mrs. Bridge, starring Paul Newman and Joanne Woodward
 Mr. Destiny, starring James Belushi
 My Blue Heaven, starring Steve Martin and Rick Moranis
 My Mother's Castle (Le Château de ma mère), directed by Yves Robert, Golden Space Needle award (for 1991) – see novel Le Château de ma mère

N
 Narrow Margin, directed by Peter Hyams, starring Gene Hackman and Anne Archer
 The Nasty Girl (Das schreckliche Mädchen), directed by Michael Verhoeven, starring Lena Stolze
 Navy SEALs, directed by Lewis Teague, starring Charlie Sheen, Michael Biehn and Joanne Whalley-Kilmer
 The NeverEnding Story II: The Next Chapter, directed by George T. Miller, starring Jonathan Brandis
 Nightbreed, directed by Clive Barker, starring Craig Sheffer, Anne Bobby, David Cronenberg and Charles Haid
 Nuns on the Run, directed by Jonathan Lynn, starring Eric Idle and Robbie Coltrane
 The Nutcracker Prince, directed by Paul Schibli, starring Kiefer Sutherland, Megan Follows, Mike MacDonald, Peter Boretski, Phyllis Diller and Peter O'Toole
Nobody's Perfect, directed by Robert Kaylor, starring Chad Lowe and Gail O'Grady

P
 Pacific Heights, directed by John Schlesinger, starring Michael Keaton, Melanie Griffith and Matthew Modine
 Postcards from the Edge, directed by Mike Nichols, starring Meryl Streep, Shirley MacLaine and Dennis Quaid
 Predator 2, directed by Stephen Hopkins, starring Danny Glover, Ruben Blades, Gary Busey, María Conchita Alonso and Bill Paxton
 Presumed Innocent, directed by Alan J. Pakula, starring Harrison Ford
 Pretty Woman, directed by Garry Marshall, starring Julia Roberts and Richard Gere
 Problem Child, directed by Dennis Dugan, starring John Ritter and Amy Yasbeck
 Pump Up the Volume, directed by Allan Moyle, starring Christian Slater

Q
 Q&A, directed by Sidney Lumet, starring Nick Nolte, Timothy Hutton and Armand Assante
 Quick Change, directed by Howard Franklin and Bill Murray, starring Bill Murray, Geena Davis and Randy Quaid
 Quigley Down Under, directed by Simon Wincer, starring Tom Selleck, Laura San Giacomo and Alan Rickman

R
 The Reflecting Skin, directed by Philip Ridley, starring Jeremy Cooper, Viggo Mortensen and Lindsay Duncan 
 Repossessed, directed by Bob Logan, starring Linda Blair Leslie Nielsen, Ned Beatty and Anthony Starke
 The Rescuers Down Under, directed by Hendel Butoy and Mike Gabriel, starring Bob Newhart, Eva Gabor, John Candy and George C. Scott
 Revenge, directed by Tony Scott, starring Kevin Costner, Anthony Quinn and Madeleine Stowe
 Reversal of Fortune, directed by Barbet Schroeder, starring Jeremy Irons, Glenn Close and Ron Silver
 RoboCop 2, directed by Irvin Kershner, starring Peter Weller and Nancy Allen
 Robot Jox, directed by Stuart Gordon, starring Gary Graham, Anne-Marie Johnson and Paul Koslo
 Rock 'n' Roll High School Forever, directed by Deborah Brock, starring Corey Feldman
 Rockula, directed by Luca Bercovici, starring Dean Cameron, Toni Basil and Thomas Dolby
 Rocky V, directed by John G. Avildsen, starring Sylvester Stallone, Talia Shire, Burt Young and Tommy Morrison
 Romeo.Juliet, directed by Armondo Linus Acosta, starring John Hurt, Maggie Smith, Ben Kingsley, Robert Powell and Vanessa Redgrave
 The Rookie, directed by Clint Eastwood, starring Clint Eastwood and Charlie Sheen
 Rosencrantz & Guildenstern Are Dead, directed by Tom Stoppard, starring Richard Dreyfuss, Tim Roth and Gary Oldman 
 The Russia House, directed by Fred Schepisi, starring Sean Connery and Michelle Pfeiffer

S
 The Sheltering Sky, directed by Bernardo Bertolucci, starring Debra Winger and John Malkovich
 Shipwrecked, directed by Nils Gaup, starring Gabriel Byrne and Stian Smestad 
 Short Time, directed by Gregg Champion, starring Dabney Coleman, Matt Frewer and Teri Garr
 A Show of Force, directed by Bruno Barreto, starring Amy Irving, Andy García, Lou Diamond Phillips, Robert Duvall and Kevin Spacey
 Sibling Rivalry, directed by Carl Reiner, starring Kirstie Alley
 Side Out, directed by Peter Israelson, starring Courtney Thorne-Smith and C. Thomas Howell
 Silent Night, Deadly Night 4: Initiation, directed by Brian Yuzna, starring Clint Howard and Neith Hunter
 Silent Scream, directed by David Hayman, starring Robert Carlyle and Iain Glen
 Singapore Sling, directed by Nikos Nikolaidis
 Spaced Invaders, directed by Patrick Read Johnson, starring Douglas Barr, Royal Dano, Ariana Richards and  J. J. Anderson
 Stanley & Iris, directed by Martin Ritt, starring Robert De Niro and Jane Fonda
 State of Grace, directed by Phil Joanou, starring Sean Penn, Ed Harris and Gary Oldman
 Stella, directed by John Erman, starring Bette Midler, John Goodman and Trini Alvarado

T
 Taking Care of Business, directed by Arthur Hiller, starring James Belushi and Charles Grodin
 Tales from the Darkside: The Movie, directed by John Harrison, starring Debbie Harry, Christian Slater, David Johansen, William Hickey, James Remar and Rae Dawn Chong
 Tatie Danielle, directed by Étienne Chatiliez, starring Tsilla Chelton
 Teenage Mutant Ninja Turtles, directed by Steve Barron, starring Judith Hoag and Elias Koteas
 Tekken, directed by Junji Sakamoto
 Texasville, directed by Peter Bogdanovich, starring Jeff Bridges, Timothy Bottoms, Cybill Shepherd
 Three Men and a Little Lady, directed by Emile Ardolino, starring Tom Selleck, Steve Guttenberg and Ted Danson
 Tie Me Up! Tie Me Down!, directed by Pedro Almodóvar, starring Victoria Abril and Antonio Banderas
 Tilaï, directed by Idrissa Ouédraogo
 Too Much Sun, directed by Robert Downey Sr., starring Robert Downey Jr. and Eric Idle
 Total Recall, directed by Paul Verhoeven, starring Arnold Schwarzenegger and Sharon Stone
 Treasure Island, directed by Fraser Clarke Heston, starring Charlton Heston and Christian Bale
 Tremors, directed by Ron Underwood, starring Kevin Bacon and Fred Ward
 Truly, Madly, Deeply, directed by Anthony Minghella, starring Alan Rickman and Juliet Stevenson
 The Two Jakes, directed by and starring Jack Nicholson, with Harvey Keitel, Meg Tilly and Eli Wallach

U
 Uchū no hōsoku, directed by Kazuyuki Izutsu, starring Masato Furuoya
 Ultra Q The Movie: Legend of the Stars, directed by Akio Jissoji

V
 Vincent & Theo, directed by Robert Altman, starring Tim Roth and Paul Rhys
 Vincent and Me, directed by Michael Rubbo, starring Nina Petronzio

W
 Welcome Home, Roxy Carmichael, directed by Jim Abrahams, starring Winona Ryder and Jeff Daniels
 Where the Heart Is, directed by John Boorman, starring Dabney Coleman, Uma Thurman and Joanna Cassidy
 White Hunter Black Heart, directed by and starring Clint Eastwood
 White Palace, directed by Luis Mandoki, starring Susan Sarandon and James Spader
 Wild at Heart, directed by David Lynch, starring Nicolas Cage, Laura Dern and Diane Ladd
 Wild Orchid, directed by Zalman King, starring Mickey Rourke, Carré Otis and Jacqueline Bisset
 The Witches, directed by Nicolas Roeg, starring Anjelica Huston, Mai Zetterling, Rowan Atkinson and Jasen Fisher

Y
 Young Guns II, directed by Geoff Murphy, starring Emilio Estevez, Kiefer Sutherland, Lou Diamond Phillips, Christian Slater and William Petersen

Births 
 January 1 - Tom Ackerley, British producer and former assistant director
 January 7 – Liam Aiken, American actor
 January 13 – Liam Hemsworth, Australian actor
 January 15 - Chris Warren (actor), American actor
 January 18 - Zeeko Zaki, Egyptian-born American actor
 January 19 - Shaunette Renée Wilson, Guyanese-born American actress
 January 21 - Jacob Smith, American actor
 January 26 – Christopher Massey, American actor, comedian and rapper
 January 30
Eiza González, Mexican actress and singer
Jake Thomas, American actor and voice actor
 February 2 - Julia Fox, Italian-American actress
 February 4 - Will Denton, American actor
 February 5 - Charlbi Dean, South African actress and model (died 2022)
 February 8 - Christian Madsen, American actor
 February 9 - Tyson Houseman, Canadian actor
 February 15 - Callum Turner, British actor and model
 February 16 - The Weeknd, Canadian singer-songwriter
 February 21 – Flavio Aquilone, Italian voice actor
 February 28 - Georgina Leonidas, British actress
 March 1 – Harry Eden, British actor
 March 11 - Reiley McClendon, American actor
 March 12 – Jörgen Liik, Estonian actor 
 March 24 – Keisha Castle-Hughes, Australian-New Zealand actress
 March 25 - Kiowa Gordon, American actor of Hualapai descent
 March 26 - Choi Woo-shik, Korean-Canadian actor
 March 28 – Laura Harrier, American actress
 March 30 - Chelsea Harris, American actress
 April 5 - Haruma Miura, Japanese actor (d. 2020)
 April 9 – Kristen Stewart, American actress
 April 10 – Alex Pettyfer, English actor, model
 April 15 – Emma Watson, English actress
 April 16 – Lorraine Nicholson, American actress
 April 17 – Gia Mantegna, American actress
 April 18 - Britt Robertson, American actress
 April 23 – Dev Patel, British actor
 May 1 - Caitlin Stasey, Australian actress and singer
 May 2 - Kay Panabaker, American retired actress
 May 3 - Harvey Guillén, American actor
 May 6 - Moses Storm, American writer, actor and comedian
 May 14 
 Rea Lest-Liik, Estonia actress
 Sasha Spielberg, American actress, daughter of producer/director Steven Spielberg and actress Kate Capshaw
 May 16
Deniz Akdeniz, Australian actor
Thomas Brodie-Sangster, British actor
Marc John Jefferies, American actor
 May 17
Ross Butler (actor), American actor
Leven Rambin, American actress
 May 18 - Luke Kleintank, American actor
 May 20 - Josh O'Connor, British actor
 May 27 - Chris Colfer, American actor and singer
 May 30 - Mason Lee, Taiwanese-American actor
 June 2 – Jack Lowden, British actor
 June 13 - Aaron Taylor-Johnson, British actor
 June 15 - Denzel Whitaker, American actor
 June 17 - Monica Barbaro, American actress
 June 20 - Jacob Wysocki, American actor and comedian
 July 2 – Margot Robbie, Australian actress
 July 4 - Melissa Barrera, Mexican actress and singer
 July 6 – Jeremy Suarez, American actor
 July 12 – Rachel Brosnahan, American-British actress
 July 15 - Olly Alexander, British musician, actor and screenwriter
 July 16 – James Maslow, American actor
 July 19 - Steven Anthony Lawrence, American actor
 July 24 – Daveigh Chase, American actress
 July 27 – Indiana Evans, Australian actress and singer-songwriter
 July 29 – Matt Prokop, American actor
 July 31 - Ruby Modine, American actress, model and singer
 August 1 - Jack O'Connell (actor), English actor
 August 4 - Chet Hanks, American actor and musician
 August 9
Bill Skarsgård, Swedish actor
Emily Tennant, Canadian actress
 August 10 – Lucas Till, American actor
 August 15 – Jennifer Lawrence, American actress
 August 17 – Rachel Hurd-Wood, British actress
 August 23 – Wesley Singerman, American record producer, songwriter and guitarist, and voice actor
 August 24 – Elizabeth Debicki, Australian actress
 August 29
Nicole Gale Anderson, American actress
Erika Harlacher, American voice actress
 September 1 - Aisling Loftus, English actress
 September 9 – Klaudia Tiitsmaa, Estonian actress
 September 11 - Georgina Terry, British actress
 September 15 – Matt Shively, American actor
 September 20 – Saara Pius, Estonian actress
 September 21
 Christian Serratos, American actress
 Allison Scagliotti, American actress and director
 September 28 - Kirsten Prout, Canadian actress
 October 5
Wesley Morgan (actor), Canadian actor and model
Taylour Paige, American actress and dancer
 October 6 - Scarlett Byrne, English actress and model
 October 13
Florian Munteanu, German-Romanian actor and model
Himesh Patel, British actor
 October 18 - Carly Schroeder, American actress
 October 22 – Jonathan Lipnicki, American actor
 October 31 - Patti Harrison, American actress and comedian
 November 2 – Kendall Schmidt, American actor
 November 4 – Jean-Luc Bilodeau, Canadian actor
 November 6 - Bowen Yang, Australian-born American actor, comedian and writer
 November 9 – Chris Di Staulo, Canadian filmmaker
 November 14 - Jessica Jacobs, Australian actress and singer (died 2008)
 November 16 - Milo Gibson, American actor
 November 26 - Rita Ora, British actress, singer and songwriter
 November 29 - Diego Boneta, Mexican actor, producer and singer
 December 20 – JoJo, American singer-songwriter and actress
 December 23
Moses J. Moseley, American actor, writer and model (died 2022)
Anna Maria Perez de Tagle, American actress and singer

Deaths

Debuts
Hank Azaria – Pretty Woman
Scott Bakula – Sibling Rivalry
Javier Bardem – The Ages of Lulu
Abraham Benrubi – Diving In
Julie Benz – Two Evil Eyes
Benjamin Bratt – Bright Angel
Robert Carlyle – Silent Scream
Nick Chinlund – The Ambulance
Scott Cohen – Jacob's Ladder
Russell Crowe – Blood Oath
Hope Davis – Flatliners
Andy Dick – The Grifters
Vin Diesel – Awakenings
Chris Ellis – Days of Thunder
Kerry Fox – An Angel at My Table
Brad Garrett – Jetsons: The Movie
Balthazar Getty – Lord of the Flies
Brendan Gleeson – The Field
John Hannah – Harbour Beat
Marcia Gay Harden – Miller's Crossing
Djimon Hounsou – Without You I'm Nothing
Nia Long – Buried Alive
George Lopez – Ski Patrol
Matt Maiellaro – Darkman
Aasif Mandvi – No Retreat, No Surrender 3: Blood Brothers
Margo Martindale – Days of Thunder
Samantha Mathis – Pump Up the Volume
Debi Mazar – Goodfellas
John McConnell – Miller's Crossing
Neal McDonough – Darkman
Rose McGowan – Class of 1999
Kristin Minter – Home Alone
Julianne Moore – Tales from the Darkside: The Movie
Chris O'Donnell – Men Don't Leave
Guy Pearce – Heaven Tonight
Luke Perry – Terminal Bliss
Christina Ricci – Mermaids
Rob Schneider – Martians Go Home
Nick Searcy – Days of Thunder
June Squibb – Alice
Julie Warner - Flatliners
Jeffrey Wright – Presumed Innocent
Catherine Zeta-Jones – Les 1001 Nuits

References 

 
Film by year